Japan was the host nation for the 1998 Winter Olympics in Nagano.  It was the second time that Japan has hosted the Winter Games, after the 1972 Winter Olympics in Sapporo, and the third time overall, after the 1964 Summer Olympics in Tokyo.

Medalists

| width=78% align=left valign=top |

Alpine skiing

Men

Men's combined

Women

Women's combined

Biathlon

Men

Men's 4 × 7.5 km relay

Women

Women's 4 × 7.5 km relay

 1 A penalty loop of 150 metres had to be skied per missed target.
 2 One minute added per missed target.

Bobsleigh

Cross-country skiing

Men

 1 Starting delay based on 10 km results. 
 C = Classical style, F = Freestyle

Men's 4 × 10 km relay

Women

 2 Starting delay based on 5 km results. 
 C = Classical style, F = Freestyle

Women's 4 × 5 km relay

Curling

Men's tournament

Group stage
Top four teams advanced to semi-finals.

|}

Tie-breaker

|}

Contestants

Women's tournament

Group stage
Top four teams advanced to semi-finals.

|}

Contestants

Figure skating

Men

Women

Pairs

Ice dancing

Freestyle skiing

Men

Women

Ice hockey

Men's tournament

Preliminary round
Top team (shaded) advanced to the first round.

Consolation round

Team roster
Akihito Sugisawa
Shin Yahata
Tsutsumi Otomo
Matt Kabayama
Ryan Kuwabara
Ryan Fujita
Atsuo Kudo
Toshiyuki Sakai
Takeshi Yamanaka
Hiroyuki Miura
Yuji Iga
Dusty Imoo
Shinichi Iwasaki
Tatsuki Katayama
Makato Kawahira
Takayuki Kobori
Kunihiko Sakurai
Takayuki Miura
Steve Tsujiura
Chris Yule

Women's tournament

Group stage
The first four teams (shaded green) advanced to medal round games.

|}

Luge

Men

(Men's) Doubles

Women

Nordic combined 

Men's individual

Events:
 normal hill ski jumping
 15 km cross-country skiing 

Men's team

Four participants per team.

Events:
 normal hill ski jumping
 5 km cross-country skiing

Short track speed skating

Men

Women

Ski jumping 

Men's team large hill

 1 Four teams members performed two jumps each.

Snowboarding

Men's halfpipe

Women's giant slalom

Women's halfpipe

Speed skating

Men

Women

References
Japan Olympic Committee database
 Olympic Winter Games 1998, full results by sports-reference.com

Nations at the 1998 Winter Olympics
1998
Winter Olympics